KPRB (106.3 FM) is a radio station broadcasting an adult contemporary music format. Licensed to Brush, Colorado, United States, the station is currently owned by Northeast Colorado Broadcasting LLC.

References

External links

PRB
Mainstream adult contemporary radio stations in the United States